Threatened fauna of Australia are those species and subspecies of birds, fish, frogs, insects, mammals, molluscs, crustaceans and reptiles to be found in Australia that are in danger of becoming extinct. This list is the list proclaimed under the Australian federal Environment Protection and Biodiversity Conservation Act 1999 (EPBC Act). The classifications are based on those used by the World Conservation Union (IUCN), however IUCN and Australian rankings do differ. Each state and territory has its own legislation relating to environmental protection.

Based on the list of Australian animals extinct in the Holocene, about 33 mammals (27 from the mainland, including the thylacine), 24 birds (three from the mainland), one reptile, and three frog species or subspecies are strongly believed to have become extinct in Australia during the Holocene epoch.  These figures exclude dubious taxa like the Roper River scrub robin (Drymodes superciliaris colcloughi) and possibly extinct taxa like the Christmas Island shrew (Crocidura trichura).

2020: new database of threatened mammals
A new online database of threatened mammals launched on 22 April 2020 reported that there had been a decline of more than a third of threatened mammal numbers in the past 20 years, but the data also show that targeted conservation efforts are working. The Threatened Mammal Index "is compiled from more than 400,000 individual surveys, and contains population trends for 57 of Australia's threatened or near-threatened terrestrial and marine mammal species".

Extinct in the wild 
One fish is listed as extinct in the wild.
 Pedder galaxias, Galaxias pedderensis

Critically endangered 
Five mammals, six birds, two reptiles, three fish and five other species are listed as critically endangered.

Invertebrates 
Amphipod crustacean Austrogammarus australis
Freshwater snail Beddomeia tumida
Boggomoss snail, Dawson Valley snail, Adclarkia dawsonensis
Margaret River hairy marron, Cherax tenuimanus
Lord Howe Island stick insect, Dryococelus australis
Golden sun moth, Synemon plana
Mitchell's rainforest snail, Thersites mitchellae

Fish 
Grey nurse shark, Carcharias taurus - east coast population
Western trout minnow, western trout galaxias, Galaxias truttaceus hesperius
Speartooth shark, Glyphis glyphis
Opal cling goby, Stiphodon semoni

Reptiles 
Western swamp tortoise, Pseudemydura umbrina
Leathery turtle, leatherback turtle, luth, Dermochelys coriacea

Birds 
Scrubtit (King Island subspecies), Acanthornis magnus greenianus
Spotted quail-thrush (Mt Lofty Ranges subspecies), Cinclosoma punctatum anachoreta
Yellow chat (Dawson subspecies), Epthianura crocea macgregori
Orange-bellied parrot, Neophema chrysogaster
Round Island petrel, Pterodroma arminjoniana
Herald petrel, Pterodroma heraldica

Mammals 
Gilbert's potoroo, Potorous gilbertii
Christmas Island pipistrelle, Pipistrellus murrayi
Bare-rumped sheathtail bat, Saccolaimus saccolaimus nudicluniatus
Southern bent-wing bat, Miniopterus schreibersii bassanii
Leadbeater's possum, Gymnobelideus leadbeateri

Endangered 
Thirty-four mammals, thirty-eight birds, eleven reptiles, eighteen frogs, sixteen fishes and eleven other species are listed as endangered.

Invertebrates
Desert sand-skipper, aestiva skipper, Croitana aestiva
Central North burrowing crayfish, Engaeus granulatus
Tasmanian giant freshwater crayfish, Astacopsis gouldi
Furneaux burrowing crayfish, Engaeus martigener
Scottsdale burrowing crayfish, Engaeus spinicaudatus
Gove crow butterfly, Euploea alcathoe enastri
Broad-toothed stag beetle, Wielangta stag beetle, Lissotes latidens
Freshwater snail, Beddomeia capensis
Land snail Mesodontrachia fitzroyana
Lord Howe placostylus, Lord Howe flax snail, Placostylus bivaricosus
Land snail Semotrachia euzyga
Land snail Sinumelon bednalli
Moth Phyllodes imperialis (southern subspecies)

Fish

Spotted handfish, spotted-hand fish, Brachionichthys hirsutus
Elizabeth Springs goby, Chlamydogobius micropterus
Golden galaxias, Galaxias auratus
Swan galaxias, Galaxias fontanus
Barred galaxias, Galaxias fuscus
Clarence galaxias, Galaxias johnstoni
Northern river shark, New Guinea river shark, Glyphis garricki 
Clarence River cod, eastern freshwater cod, Maccullochella ikei
Trout cod, Maccullochella macquariensis
Mary River cod, Maccullochella peelii mariensis
Macquarie perch, Macquaria australasica
Lake Eacham rainbowfish, Melanotaenia eachamensis
Oxleyan pygmy perch, Nannoperca oxleyana
Arthurs paragalaxias, Paragalaxias mesotes
Maugean skate, Port Davey skate, Zearaja maugeana
Redfin blue-eye, Scaturiginichthys vermeilipinnis

Amphibians

White-bellied frog, creek frog, Geocrinia alba
Yellow-spotted tree frog, yellow-spotted bell frog,  Litoria castanea
Armoured mistfrog, Litoria lorica
Waterfall frog, torrent tree frog, Litoria nannotis
Mountain mistfrog, Litoria nyakalensis
Spotted tree frog, Litoria spenceri
Fleay's frog, Mixophyes fleayi
Southern barred frog, giant barred frog, Mixophyes iteratus
Lace-eyed tree frog, Australian lace-lid, Nyctimystes dayi
Baw Baw frog, Philoria frosti
Southern corroboree frog, Pseudophryne corroboree
Sunset frog, Spicospina flammocaerulea
Eungella day frog, Taudactylus eungellensis
Tinkling frog, Taudactylus rheophilus
Booroolong frog, Litoria booroolongensis

Reptiles

Loggerhead turtle, Caretta caretta
Yellow-snouted ground gecko, Diplodactylus occultus
Arhem land egernia, Egernia obiri
Slater's skink, floodplain skink, Egernia slateri slateri
Western spiny-tailed skink, Egernia stokesii badia
Gulf snapping turtle, Elusor lavarackorum
Mary River tortoise, Elusor macrurus
Blue Mountains water skink, Eulamprus leuraensis
Corangamite water skink, Eulamprus tympanum marnieae
Pacific ridley, olive ridley, Lepidochelys olivacea
Allan's lerista, retro slider, Lerista allanae
Pygmy blue-tongue lizard, Adelaide blue-tongue lizard, Tiliqua adelaidensis
Grassland earless dragon, Tympanocryptis lineata pinguicolla
Mary River turtle

Birds

Brown thornbill (King Island subspecies), Acanthiza pusilla archibaldi
Christmas Island goshawk, Accipiter fasciatus natalis
Wedge-tailed eagle (Tasmanian subspecies), Aquila audax fleayi
Red-tailed black-cockatoo (south-eastern subspecies), Calyptorhynchus banksii graptogyne
Glossy black-cockatoo (South Australian and Kangaroo Island subspecies), Calyptorhynchus lathami halmaturinus
Carnaby's black cockatoo, short-billed black cockatoo, Calyptorhynchus latirostris
Southern cassowary (Australian subspecies), Casuarius casuarius johnsonii
Common emerald dove (Christmas Island subspecies), Chalcophaps indica natalis
Norfolk Island green parrot (formerly the Norfolk Island subspecies of the red-fronted parakeet),  Cyanoramphus cookii
Coxen's fig parrot, Cyclopsitta diophthalma coxeni

Eastern bristlebird, Dasyornis brachypterus
Amsterdam albatross, Diomedea amsterdamensis
Tristan albatross, Diomedea dabbenena
Northern royal albatross, Diomedea sanfordi
Gouldian finch, Erythrura gouldiae
Buff-banded rail (Cocos (Keeling) Islands subspecies), Gallirallus philippensis andrewsi
Chestnut-rumped heathwren (Mt Lofty Ranges subspecies), Hylacola pyrrhopygia parkeri
Swift parrot, Lathamus discolor
Helmeted honeyeater, Lichenostomus melanops cassidix
Southern giant-petrel, Macronectes giganteus
Black-eared miner, Manorina melanotis
Hooded robin (Tiwi Islands subspecies), Melanodryas cucullata melvillensis
Star finch (eastern and southern subspecies), Neochmia ruficauda ruficauda
Norfolk Island boobook, Ninox novaeseelandiae undulata
Forty-spotted pardalote, Pardalotus quadragintus
Night parrot, Pezoporus occidentalis
Western ground parrot, Pezoporus flaviventris
Black-throated finch (southern subspecies), Poephila cincta cincta
Golden-shouldered parrot, Psephotus chrysopterygius
Western whipbird (western heath subspecies), Psophodes nigrogularis nigrogularis
Gould's petrel (nominate subspecies), Pterodroma leucoptera leucoptera
Antarctic tern (New Zealand subspecies), Sterna vittata bethunei
Southern emu-wren (Fleurieu Peninsula and Mount Lofty subspecies), Stipiturus malachurus intermedius
Abbott's booby, Sula abbotti
Chatham albatross, Thalassarche eremita
Christmas thrush, Turdus poliocephalus erythropleurus
Buff-breasted button-quail, Turnix olivii
Masked owl (Tiwi Islands subspecies), Tyto novaehollandiae melvillensis
Regent honeyeater, Xanthomyza phrygia

Mammals
Blue whale, Balaenoptera musculus
Julia Creek dunnart, Sminthopsis douglasi
Northern bettong, Bettongia tropica
Mountain pygmy-possum, Burramys parvus
Christmas Island shrew, Crocidura attenuata trichura
Ampurta, Dasycercus hillieri
Northern quoll, Dasyurus hallucatus
Tiger quoll (north Queensland subspecies), Dasyurus maculatus gracilis
Tiger quoll (southeastern mainland population), Dasyurus maculatus maculatus

Southern right whale, Eubalaena australis
Semon's leaf-nosed bat, greater wart-nosed horseshoe-bat, Hipposideros semoni
Southern brown bandicoot, Isoodon obesulus obesulus
Rufous hare-wallaby, Lagorchestes hirsutus unnamed subspecies (central mainland form)
Northern marsupial mole, Notoryctes caurinus
Southern marsupial mole, Notoryctes typhlops
Bridled nail-tail wallaby, Onychogalea fraenata
Dibbler, Parantechinus apicalis
Western barred bandicoot (Shark Bay subspecies), Perameles bougainville bougainville 
Eastern barred bandicoot, Perameles gunnii unnamed subspecies, mainland
Mahogany glider, Petaurus gracilis
Proserpine rock-wallaby, Petrogale persephone
Red-tailed phascogale, Phascogale calura
Long-footed potoroo, Potorous longipes
Spotted cuscus, Spilocuscus maculatus
Smoky mouse, Pseudomys fumeus
Hastings River mouse, Pseudomys oralis
Greater large-eared horseshoe bat, Rhinolophus philippinensis (large form)
Tasmanian devil Sarcophilus harrisii
Kangaroo Island dunnart, Sminthopsis aitkeni
Julia Creek dunnart, Sminthopsis douglasi
Sandhill dunnart, Sminthopsis psammophila
Carpentarian rock rat, Zyzomys palatalis
Central rock rat, Zyzomys pedunculatus
Northern hairy-nosed wombat Lasiorhinus krefftii

Vulnerable

Invertebrates
Draculoides bramstokeri
Mount Arthur burrowing crayfish, Engaeus orramakunna
Burnie burrowing crayfish, Engaeus yabbimunna
Lasionectes exleyi, a cave-dwelling remipede crustacean
Giant Gippsland earthworm, Megascolides australis
Bathurst copper, purple copper, Paralucia spinifera

Fish

Red handfish, Brachionichthys politus
Grey nurse shark, Carcharias taurus (west coast population)
Great white shark, Carcharodon carcharias

Edgbaston goby, Chlamydogobius squamigenus
Murray hardyhead, Craterocephalus fluviatilis
Swamp galaxias, Galaxias parvus
Saddled galaxias, Galaxias tanycephalus
Eastern dwarf galaxias, dwarf galaxias, Galaxiella pusilla
Murray cod, cod, Maccullochella peelii
Blind gudgeon, Milyeringa veritas
Flinders Ranges gudgeon, Mogurnda clivicola
Balston's pygmy perch, Nannatherina balstoni
Yarra pygmy perch, Nannoperca obscura
Ewens pygmy perch, golden pygmy perch, variegated pygmy perch, Nannoperca variegata
Australian lungfish, Queensland lungfish, Neoceratodus forsteri
Blind cave eel, Ophisternon candidum
Shannon paragalaxias, Paragalaxias dissimilis
Great Lake paragalaxias, Paragalaxias eleotroides
Dwarf sawfish, Queensland sawfish, Pristis clavata
Freshwater sawfish, largetooth sawfish, Pristis microdon
Green sawfish, dindagubba, narrowsnout sawfish, Pristis zijsron
Australian grayling, Prototroctes maraena
Honey blue-eye, Pseudomugil mellis
Whale shark, Rhincodon typus
Waterfall Bay handfish, Sympterichthys species [CSIRO #T1996.01]
Ziebell's handfish Sympterichthys species [CSIRO #T6.01]

Frogs

Orange-bellied frog, Geocrinia vitellina
Giant burrowing frog, Heleioporus australiacus
Green and golden bell frog, Litoria aurea
Littlejohn's tree frog, heath frog, Litoria littlejohni
Wallum sedge frog, Litoria olongburensis
Peppered tree frog, Litoria piperata
Southern bell frog, growling grass frog, warty bell frog, Litoria raniformis
Alpine tree frog, Verreaux's alpine tree frog, Litoria verreauxii alpina
Stuttering frog, southern barred frog (in Victoria), Mixophyes balbus
Magnificent brood frog, Pseudophryne covacevichae
Northern corroboree frog, Pseudophryne pengilleyi
Kroombit tinker frog, Pleione's torrent frog, Taudactylus pleione
Blue Mountains tree frog, Litoria citropa

Reptiles

Five-clawed worm-skink, long-legged worm-skink, Anomalopus mackayi
Pink-tailed worm-lizard, Aprasia parapulchella
Flinders Ranges worm-lizard, Aprasia pseudopulchella
Hermite Island worm-lizard, Aprasia rostrata rostrata
Green turtle, Chelonia mydas
Lord Howe Island gecko, Christinus guentheri
Three-toed snake-tooth skink, Coeranoscincus reticulatus
Yinnietharra rock dragon, Ctenophorus yinnietharra
Airlie Island ctenotus, Ctenotus angusticeps
Lancelin Island skink, Ctenotus lancelini
Hamelin ctenotus, Ctenotus zastictus
Striped legless lizard, Delma impar
Striped-tailed delma, Delma labialis
Atherton delma, legless lizard, Delma mitella
Collared delma, Delma torquata
Ornamental snake, Denisonia maculata
Great desert skink, Egernia kintorei
Yakka skink, Egernia rugosa
Baudin Island spiny-tailed skink, Egernia stokesii aethiops
Bell's turtle, Namoi River turtle, Bell's saw-shelled turtle, Elseya belli
Bellinger River emydura, Emydura macquarii signata
Hawksbill turtle, Eretmochelys imbricata
Dunmall's snake, Furina dunmalli
Broad-headed snake, Hoplocephalus bungaroides
Christmas Island gecko, Lister's gecko, Lepidodactylus listeri
Mount Cooper striped lerista, Lerista vittata
Pilbara olive python, Liasis olivaceus barroni
Flatback turtle, Natator depressus
Pernatty knob-tail, Nephrurus deleani
Pedra Branca skink, red-throated skink, Niveoscincus palfreymani
Krefft's tiger snake (Flinders Ranges), Notechis ater ater
Bronzeback snake-lizard, Ophidiocephalus taeniatus
Brigalow scaly-foot, Paradelma orientalis
Lord Howe Island skink, Pseudemoia lichenigera
Christmas Island blind snake, Ramphotyphlops exocoeti
Fitzroy River turtle, Rheodytes leukops
Border thick-tailed gecko, Underwoodisaurus sphyrurus

Birds
Slender-billed thornbill (western subspecies), Acanthiza iredalei iredalei
Grey grasswren (Bulloo River subspecies), Amytornis barbatus barbatus
Thick-billed grasswren (eastern subspecies), Amytornis textilis modestus
Thick-billed grasswren (Gawler Ranges subspecies), Amytornis textilis myall
Lesser noddy (Australian subspecies), Anous tenuirostris melanops
Noisy scrub-bird, Atrichornis clamosus
Muir's corella, Cacatua pastinator pastinator
Baudin's black-cockatoo, long-billed black-cockatoo, Calyptorhynchus baudinii
Cape Barren goose (south-western subspecies), Recherche Cape Barren goose, Cereopsis novaehollandiae grisea

Western bristlebird, Dasyornis longirostris
Antipodean albatross, Diomedea antipodensis
Southern royal albatross, Diomedea epomophora
Wandering albatross, Diomedea exulans
Gibson's albatross, Diomedea gibsoni
Red goshawk, Erythrotriorchis radiatus
Crested shrike-tit (northern subspecies), northern shrike-tit, Falcunculus frontatus whitei
Christmas Island frigatebird, Andrew's frigatebird, Fregata andrewsi
White-bellied storm-petrel (Tasman Sea or Australasian subspecies), Fregetta grallaria grallaria
Squatter pigeon (southern subspecies), Geophaps scripta scripta
Partridge pigeon (western subspecies), Geophaps smithii blaauwi
Partridge pigeon (eastern subspecies), Geophaps smithii smithii
Blue petrel, Halobaena caerulea
Malleefowl, Leipoa ocellata
Northern giant-petrel, Macronectes halli
Purple-crowned fairy-wren, (western subspecies), Malurus coronatus coronatus
White-winged fairywren (Barrow Island subspecies), Barrow Island black-and-white fairywren, Malurus leucopterus edouardi
White-winged fairy-wren (Dirk Hartog Island subspecies), Dirk Hartog black-and-white fairy-wren, Malurus leucopterus leucopterus
Crimson finch (white-bellied subspecies), Neochmia phaeton evangelinae
Christmas Island hawk-owl, Ninox natalis
Norfolk golden whistler, Pachycephala pectoralis xanthoprocta

Red-lored whistler, Pachycephala rufogularis
Fairy prion (southern subspecies), Pachyptila turtur subantarctica
Plains-wanderer, Pedionomus torquatus
Scarlet robin (Norfolk Island subspecies), Petroica multicolor multicolor
Heard shag, Phalacrocorax nivalis
Macquarie shag, Phalacrocorax purpurascens
Sooty albatross, Phoebetria fusca
Princess parrot, Alexandra's parrot, Polytelis alexandrae
Regent parrot (eastern subspecies), Polytelis anthopeplus monarchoides
Superb parrot, Polytelis swainsonii
Western whipbird (eastern subspecies), Psophodes nigrogularis leucogaster
Western whipbird (western mallee subspecies), Psophodes nigrogularis oberon
Soft-plumaged petrel, Pterodroma mollis
Kermadec petrel (western subspecies), Pterodroma neglecta neglecta
Australian painted snipe, Rostratula australis
Antarctic tern (Indian Ocean subspecies), Sterna vittata vittata
Southern emu-wren (Eyre Peninsula subspecies), Stipiturus malachurus parimeda
Mallee emu-wren, Stipiturus mallee
Lord Howe Island currawong, pied currawong (Lord Howe Island subspecies), Strepera graculina crissalis
Buller's albatross, Thalassarche bulleri 
Indian yellow-nosed albatross, Thalassarche carteri
Shy albatross, Thalassarche cauta
Grey-headed albatross, Thalassarche chrysostoma
Campbell albatross, Thalassarche impavida
Black-browed albatross, Thalassarche melanophris
Pacific albatross, Thalassarche nov. sp.
Salvin's albatross, Thalassarche salvini
White-capped albatross, Thalassarche steadi
Lord Howe woodhen, Tricholimnas sylvestris
Black-breasted button-quail, Turnix melanogaster
Abrolhos painted buttonquail, Turnix varius scintillans
Masked owl (northern subspecies), Tyto novaehollandiae kimberli

Mammals
Subantarctic fur seal, Arctocephalus tropicalis
Sei whale, Balaenoptera borealis
Fin whale, Balaenoptera physalus
Boodie, burrowing bettong (Shark Bay subspecies), Bettongia lesueur lesueur
Boodie, burrowing bettong (Barrow and Boodie Islands subspecies), Bettongia lesueur unnamed subspecies
Dingo, Canis dingo
Large-eared pied bat, large pied bat, Chalinolobus dwyeri
Kowari, Dasycercus byrnei
Mulgara, Dasycercus cristicauda
Chuditch, western quoll, Dasyurus geoffroii
Spot-tailed quoll, spotted-tail quoll, tiger quoll (Tasmanian population), Dasyurus maculatus maculatus
Golden bandicoot (mainland subspecies), Isoodon auratus auratus
Golden bandicoot (Barrow Island subspecies), Isoodon auratus barrowensis
Southern brown bandicoot (Nuyts Archipelago subspecies), Isoodon obesulus nauticus
Spectacled hare-wallaby (Barrow Island subspecies), Lagorchestes conspicillatus conspicillatus
Rufous hare-wallaby (Bernier Island subspecies), Lagorchestes hirsutus bernieri
Rufous hare-wallaby (Dorre Island subspecies), Lagorchestes hirsutus dorreae
Banded hare-wallaby, marnine, munning, Lagostrophus fasciatus fasciatus
Greater stick-nest rat, wopilkara, Leporillus conditor
Barrow Island euro, Macropus robustus isabellinus
Greater bilby, Macrotis lagotis
Humpback whale, Megaptera novaeangliae
Golden-backed tree-rat, Mesembriomys macrurus
Southern elephant seal, Mirounga leonina
Numbat, Myrmecobius fasciatus
Australian sea-lion, Neophoca cinerea
Northern hopping-mouse, Notomys aquilo
Dusky hopping-mouse, wilkiniti, Notomys fuscus
Corben's long-eared bat, south-eastern long-eared bat, Nyctophilus corbeni
Eastern barred bandicoot (Tasmania subspecies), Perameles gunnii gunnii
Yellow-bellied glider, fluffy glider (Wet Tropics subspecies), Petaurus australis unnamed subspecies.
Warru, black-footed rock-wallaby (MacDonnell Ranges race), Petrogale lateralis MacDonnell Ranges race
Black-footed rock-wallaby (West Kimberley race), Petrogale lateralis West Kimberley race
Recherche rock-wallaby, Petrogale lateralis hacketti
Black-flanked rock-wallaby, Petrogale lateralis lateralis
Pearson Island rock-wallaby, Petrogale lateralis pearsoni
Brush-tailed rock-wallaby, Petrogale penicillata
Yellow-footed rock-wallaby (South Australia and New South Wales subspecies), Petrogale xanthopus xanthopus
Long-nosed potoroo (south-east mainland subspecies), Potorous tridactylus tridactylus
Carpentarian antechinus, Pseudantechinus mimulus
Western ringtail possum, Pseudocheirus occidentalis
Plains rat, Pseudomys australis
Djoongari, Alice Springs mouse, Shark Bay mouse, Pseudomys fieldi
Pilliga mouse, Pseudomys pilligaensis 
Heath mouse, Pseudomys shortridgei 
Spectacled flying-fox, Pteropus conspicillatus
Grey-headed flying-fox, Pteropus poliocephalus
Pilbara leaf-nosed bat, Rhinonicteris aurantius (Pilbara form)
Quokka, Setonix brachyurus
Butler's dunnart, Sminthopsis butleri
Boullanger Island dunnart, Sminthopsis griseoventer boullangerensis
Common wombat (Bass Strait subspecies), Vombatus ursinus ursinus
False water rat, water mouse, Xeromys myoides
Arnhem rock-rat, Arnhem Land rock-rat, Zyzomys maini

Conservation dependent
Four fish and one mammal are conservation dependent.

Fish
School shark, eastern school shark, snapper shark, tope, soupfin shark, Galeorhinus galeus
Orange roughy, deep-sea perch, red roughy, Hoplostethus atlanticus
Eastern gemfish, Rexea solandri (eastern Australian population)
Southern bluefin tuna, Thunnus maccoyii

Mammals
Southern bent-wing bat, Miniopterus schreibersii bassanii

Threatened species legislation

Federal legislation
Environment Protection and Biodiversity Conservation Act 1999 (Cth) and Regulations set up a framework for protection of the Australian environment, including its biodiversity and its natural and culturally significant places.

State legislation

Threatened species in Australia are protected by, or affected by, four main types of legislation:
 Protected areas legislation (e.g., National Parks and Wildlife Act 1974 (NSW)) 
 Threatened species legislation (e.g. Threatened Species Conservation Act 1995 (NSW), Threatened Species Protection Act 1995 (Tas)) 
 Native vegetation conservation laws 
 Fisheries legislation.

See also
List of Australian animals extinct in the Holocene
Fauna of Australia
Invasive species in Australia
Land clearing in Australia
Threatened species#Australia
Woodchipping in Australia

References

External links
Department of the Environment and Energy. EPBC Act List of Threatened Fauna

Fauna of Australia by conservation status
Lists of animals of Australia
Australia
.T
.
Australian animals